Sainte-Sève is a commune in the Finistère department of Brittany in north-western France.

Population
Inhabitants of Sainte-Sève are called in French Saint-Sévistes.

See also
Communes of the Finistère department

References

External links

Mayors of Finistère Association 

Communes of Finistère